The III Reconnaissance Command is a disbanded United States Army Air Forces unit.  Its last assignment was with Third Air Force stationed at Rapid City Army Air Base, South Dakota, where it was inactivated on 8 April 1946. After transferring to the United States Air Force in September 1947, it was disbanded in October 1948.

The command was organized in September 1941 as the 1st Air Support Command, an element of 1st Air Force to control light bombardment and observation units in its area of responsibility.  Following the attack on Pearl Harbor, the command's units conducted antisubmarine warfare patrols off the Atlantic Coast. In August 1942, it transferred to 3rd Air Force, which had the responsibility to train air support units for the Army Air Forces (AAF) and assumed the mission of training units and aircrews for overseas deployment.  In 1943, it became the I Tactical Air Division (later III Tactical Air Division) under III Tactical Air Command.  In the final months of the war, it specialized in training reconnaissance units.

History

Initial organization under 1st Air Force
General Headquarters Air Force (GHQ AF) reorganized its four regional air districts as Numbered Air Forces in the spring of 1941.  By the fall of that year, each of these had organized as a support command and three combat commands.  

In the summer of 1941 GHQ AF had decided to establish commands to direct its air support mission in each numbered air force, plus one additional command reporting directly to GHQ AF.  These commands would be manned from inactivating wings, and would initially control only observation squadrons, which would be transferred from the control of the corps and divisions, although they would remain attached to these ground units.  1st Air Force organized 1st Air Support Command at Mitchel Field, New York in September 1941, drawing its personnel and equipment from the 7th Pursuit Wing, which was simultaneously inactivated.  

New observation groups were formed, with a cadre drawn from National Guard squadrons that had been mobilized in 1940 and 1941.  During the Carolina Maneuvers of 1941, the command was attached to First Army.  Unlike the opposing force, the command posts of the air and ground elements were located together, and the commander of the air support command doubled as the air staff officer of the ground force commander.  The opposing force command posts were separated by sixty miles, which enabled greater freedom of action and use of airpower more aggressively.

Following the attack on Pearl Harbor the command came under the control of the Eastern Theater of Operations and flew antisubmarine patrols off the east coast. However, by early 1942, the command's first commander William E. Kepner, like two of the other commanders of air support commands had moved overseas, and similar demands led GHQ AF to believe it had little more than the "remnants" of the command remaining.  However, in May, the Army Air Forces (AAF) reaffirmed that each of the continental numbered air forces would have an air support command and the command's manning was brought back up.  Although most of the command's observation units were withdrawn from antisubmarine operations in June 1942, the command continued limited antisubmarine patrols until 15 October 1942, when Army Air Forces Antisubmarine Command took over the mission.

Transfer to 3rd Air Force
The AAF determined that its continental air forces would specialize in their training operations and that all their air support commands would be reassigned to Third Air Force.  In August 1942, the command was one of the first reassigned to Third Air Force.  This was followed by a move to Morris Field, North Carolina, a base in the Third Air Force area in November 1942.

In October of 1942, AAF directed that half of the observation groups assigned to the command were to be reduced to 50% strength or less with their personnel used to form new tow target squadrons, or transferred to heavy bomber Operational Training Unit (OTU)s or Replacement Training Unit (RTU)s.  The command continued to train light bomber crews.

In August 1943, the command was redesignated the I Tactical Air Division with the intent that the command would engage in combined training with army ground forces. This included participation in maneuvers.  The command became the III Tactical Air Division in the spring of 1944.  In May 1944, the command began to specialize in training reconnaissance aircrews and organizations.  In June 1945, this mission change was recognized by a change in name to III Reconnaissance Command.

After the end of the war, the command moved to Rapid City Army Air Base, South Dakota in November 1945, and was inactivated there in April 1946.

Lineage
 Constituted as the 1st Air Support Command on 21 August 1941
 Activated on 4 September 1941
 Redesignated 1st Ground Air Support Command c. 30 April 1942
 Redesignated I Air Support Command c. 18 September 1942
 Redesignated I Tactical Air Division on 28 August 1943
 Redesignated III Tactical Air Division  c. 15 April 1944
 Redesignated III Reconnaissance Command c. 1 June 1945
 Inactivated on 9 April 1946
 Disbanded on 8 October 1948

Assignments
 1st Air Force, 4 September 1941
 3rd Air Force (later Third Air Force), 17 August 1942
 III Tactical Air Command, c. 15 April 1944
 Third Air Force, c. 1 June 1945 – 9 April 1946

Components
 Groups
 26th Observation Group: 1 September 1941 – 17 August 1942
 45th Bombardment Group: 21 August 1941 – 5 January 1942
 46th Bombardment Group: 10 November 1942 – 25 January 1943
 48th Fighter-Bomber Group: attached 10 September 1943 – 14 January 1944
 59th Observation Group: 1 September 1941 – 21 August 1942
 69th Tactical Reconnaissance Group, 18 April 1944 – 27 March 1945
 411th Bombardment Group: c. 15 August 1943 – 1 May 1944

 Squadrons

 1st Air Support Communications Squadron, attached, c. 8 September 1943; assigned 3 November 1943 – 31 March 1944
 2d Balloon Squadron: 1 September 1941 – 3 February 1942 (thereafter disbanded)
 3d Observation Squadron: 1 September 1941 – 12 March 1942 (attached to the Coast Artillery School)
 5th Communications Squadron, Air Support (later 5th Air Support Communications Squadron): 15 May 1942 – c. 13 June 1943
 6th Reconnaissance Squadron: 18 April – 1 October 1944
 7th Reconnaissance Squadron: 8 November 1943 – 1 October 1944
 9th Communications Squadron, Air Support (later 9th Air Support Communications Squadron): 21 August 1942 – c. 21 November 1943
 14th Air Support Communications Squadron (later 14th Tactical Air Communications Squadron): 3 March 1943 – 18 April 1944
 14th Liaison Squadron: 11 August 1943 – 4 April 1944
 14th Tow Target Squadron: 17 December 1942 – 4 November 1943
 18th Air Support Communications Squadron, 3 November 1943 – c. 12 February 1944
 19th Liaison Squadron: 11 August 1943 – c. 15 April 1944
 36th Photographic Reconnaissance Squadron: 29 March – c. November 1944
 37th Photographic Reconnaissance Squadron: 12 April – 15 November 1944
 39th Photographic Reconnaissance Squadron: 12 April 1944 – 6 January 1945
 40th Photographic Reconnaissance Squadron: 18 April – 3 June 1944
 41st Photographic Reconnaissance Squadron: 24 June – 1 October 1944; 4 December 1944 – 18 April 1945
 57th Reconnaissance Squadron: 21 July 1945 – 25 January 1946
 58th Reconnaissance Squadron: 21 July 1945 – 31 March 1946
 72d Liaison Squadron: 11 August 1943 – c. 14 June 1944
 103d Reconnaissance Squadron: 18 April 1944 – 3 June 1944
 119th Observation Squadron: 1 September 1941 – 29 March 1942 (attached to 59th Observation Group)
 115th Liaison Squadron: 18 April – 29 October 1944
 121st Liaison Squadron: 11 August 1943 – c. 20 March 1944
 127th Liaison Squadron: 11 August 1943 – 31 April 1944
 158th Liaison Squadron: 1 March – 1 October 1944
 162nd Liaison Squadron: 15 May – 24 June 1944
 163rd Liaison Squadron: 15 May 44 – 20 January 1945

 Base Units
 321st AAF Base Unit (Headquarters, III Tactical Air Division [later Headquarters, III Reconnaissance Command]): 1 May 1944 – c. 1 November 1945
 322nd AAF Base Unit (56th Bombardment Operational Training Wing, Light): 1 May 1944 – c. 1 November 1945
 333rd AAF Base Unit (Replacement Training Unit, Light, Bombardment [later Combat Crew Training Station, Light Bombardment]): 1 May 1944 – 31 January 1945http://www.airforcehistoryindex.org/data/000/175/854.xml
 334th AAF Base Unit (Replacement Training Unit, Light, Bombardment [later Combat Crew Training Station, Light Bombardment]): 1 May – 1 October 1944
 347th AAF Base Unit (Combat Crew Training Station, Tactical Reconnaissance): c. 1 June 1945 – c. 28 March 1946
 348th AAF Base Unit (Combat Crew Training Station, Photographic Reconnaissance): c. 1 June 1945 – 29 December 1944
 349th AAF Base Unit (Combat Crew Training Station, Liaison): c. 1 June 1945 – c. 7 November 1945
 353rd AAF Base Unit (Maneuver Station): 1 May 1944 – c. 31 January 1946
 379th AAF Base Unit (Combat Crew Training Station, Tactical Reconnaissance): c. 1 June 1945 – 1945

Stations
 Mitchel Field, New York, 4 September 1941
 Morris Field, North Carolina, c. 10 November 1942
 Key Field, Mississippi, c. 3 April 1944
 Rapid City Army Air Base, South Dakota, November 1945 – 9 April 1946

Campaign

References

Notes
 Explanatory notes

 Citations

Bibliography

 
  
 
 
 

03 Command Reconn
Reconnaissance units of the United States Army Air Forces
Military units and formations disestablished in 1948